Laneville High School or Laneville School is a 1A public high school located in unincorporated Laneville, Texas (USA). It is part of the Laneville Independent School District located in south central Rusk County. In 2011, the school was rated "Academically Acceptable" by the Texas Education Agency.

Athletics
The Laneville Yellow Jackets compete in the following sports:

Basketball
Track and Field

State Titles
Boys Basketball - 
1992(1A), 1993(1A), 2008(1A/D1)

State Finalists
Boys Basketball – 
1952(D3), 2007(1A/D2) 2014(1A)

References

External links
Laneville ISD

Public high schools in Texas
Public middle schools in Texas
Public elementary schools in Texas
Education in Rusk County, Texas